Yasmine Abderrahim (born April 16, 1999 in Béjaïa) is an Algerian volleyball player.

Club information
Current club :  ASW Bejaia

References

1999 births
Volleyball players from Béjaïa
Living people
Algerian women's volleyball players
21st-century Algerian people
Mediterranean Games competitors for Algeria
Competitors at the 2022 Mediterranean Games